The Ojibwe language is spoken in a series of dialects occupying adjacent territories, forming a language complex in which mutual intelligibility between adjacent dialects may be comparatively high but declines between some non-adjacent dialects. Mutual intelligibility between some non-adjacent dialects, notably Ottawa, Severn Ojibwe, and Algonquin, is low enough that they could be considered distinct languages. There is no single dialect that is considered the most prestigious or most prominent, and no standard writing system that covers all dialects. The relative autonomy of the regional dialects of Ojibwe is associated with an absence of linguistic or political unity among Ojibwe-speaking groups.

The dialects of Ojibwe are spoken in Canada from western Québec, through Ontario, Manitoba and parts of Saskatchewan, with outlying communities in Alberta and British Columbia, and in the United States from Michigan through Wisconsin and Minnesota, with a number of communities in North Dakota and Montana, as well as migrant groups in Kansas and Oklahoma. The dialects of Ojibwe are divided into distinctive northern and southern groups, with intervening transition dialects that have a mixture of features from the adjacent dialects.

This article lays out the general structure of Ojibwe dialectology, with links to separate articles on each dialect. The Potawatomi language is closely related to Ojibwe; information is at Ojibwe language: Relationship of Ojibwe and Potawatomi. An Ojibwe pidgin language is discussed at Ojibwe language: Broken Ogghibbeway, and the use of various dialects of Ojibwe as lingua franca is at Ojibwe language: Lingua franca. Ojibwe borrowed words are found in Menominee and Michif; for discussion see Ojibwe language: Ojibwe influence on other languages.

Classification

The recognized dialects of Ojibwe are spoken in the region surrounding the Great Lakes, in Ontario, Minnesota,  Wisconsin, and Michigan, with other groups of speakers in western Québec in the area along the Québec-Ontario border, Manitoba, Saskatchewan, and a few communities in Alberta, North Dakota, Montana, British Columbia, Oklahoma and Kansas.  While there is some variation in the classification of Ojibwe dialects, at a minimum the following are recognized, proceeding west to east: Western Ojibwe (Saulteaux), Southwestern Ojibwe (Chippewa), Northwestern Ojibwe, Severn Ojibwe (Oji-Cree), Ottawa (Odawa), Eastern Ojibwe, and Algonquin. Field research conducted in the 1980s and 1990s led to the recognition of several other dialects: (a) Berens Ojibwe along the Berens River in northwestern Ontario, to be distinguished from Northwestern Ojibwe; (b) Border Lakes Ojibwe, in western Ontario in the area bounded by the borders of Ontario, Manitoba, and Minnesota; (c) North of (Lake) Superior; and (d) Nipissing. Some sources recognize a Central Ojibwe dialect, covering approximately the same territory as North of (Lake) Superior and Nipissing. In this article the analysis in which Central Ojibwe is not recognized is accepted.

Two analyses of the relationships between the Ojibwe dialects  are in agreement on the assignment of the strongly differentiated Ottawa dialect to a separate subgroup, and the assignment of Severn Ojibwe and Algonquin to another subgroup, and differ primarily with respect to the relationships between the less strongly differentiated dialects. Rhodes and Todd recognize several different dialectal subgroupings within Ojibwe: (a) Ottawa; (b) Severn and Algonquin; (c) a third subgroup which is further divided into (i) a subgrouping of Northwestern Ojibwe and Saulteaux, and a subgrouping consisting of Eastern Ojibwe and a further subgrouping comprising Southwestern Ojibwe and Central Ojibwe (see figure, this section).

Valentine has proposed that Ojibwe dialects are divided into three groups: a northern tier consisting of Severn Ojibwe and Algonquin; a southern tier consisting of "Odawa, Chippewa, Eastern Ojibwe, the Ojibwe of the Border Lakes region between Minnesota and Ontario, and Saulteaux; and third, a transitional zone between these two polar groups, in which there is a mixture of northern and southern features." In this article the classification proposed by Valentine is utilized for the classification and subgrouping of Ojibwe dialects.

The distinction between the northern and southern dialect groupings is argued to "align to some extent with traditional subsistence patterns, in that the southern groups typically harvested maple sugar and wild rice, allowing for population aggregations that promoted such social institutions as medicine societies and totemic clan structures." Similarly, northern groups have made most extensive use of northern "waterways that flow into James and Hudson Bays, while southern groups were situated on the Great Lakes, Huron and Superior."

Ojibwe dialects are distinguished by features of phonology, morphology, syntax, and lexicon. Some dialects, most notably Severn Ojibwe, Algonquin, and Ottawa are characterized by many distinct features; such extensive differentiation is associated with lengthy "periods of isolation from other varieties of Ojibwe". Dialects that are adjacent to strongly differentiated dialects may show a mixture of transitional features. For example, the Border Lakes dialect is not strongly distinguished from the adjacent Western Ojibwe (Saulteaux) and Southwestern Ojibwe (Chippewa) dialects, and is characterized by the "grading of a few minor features."

In some situations there is a mismatch between speakers' self-designations and what is supported by linguistic data. For example, the communities at Golden Lake, Ontario and Maniwaki, Quebec are described by speakers at those locations as members of the Algonquin dialect, although linguistically both are distinct from the clearly Algonquin communities north of those locations, and are assigned to the Nipissing dialect.

The degree of mutually intelligibility between nonadjacent dialects of Ojibwe varies considerably; recent research has helped to show the extent of the distance between Ottawa and the maximally different Severn Ojibwe dialect spoken in northwestern Ontario. Because the dialects of Ojibwe are at least partly mutually intelligible, Ojibwe is usually considered to be a single language with a number of dialects.  However, the relatively low degrees of mutual intelligibility between some nonadjacent Ojibwe dialects led to the suggestion that Ojibwe "...could be said to consist of several languages...".

Northern dialects
The Northern dialects of Ojibwe are Severn Ojibwe and Algonquin; they are strongly differentiated from other dialects of Ojibwe. A set of features characterise the northern dialects, and are found to varying degrees in adjacent transition dialects.

Severn Ojibwe
Ethnologue entry and ISO 639-3 code: OJS (Severn Ojibwe)

Severn Ojibwe, also called Oji-Cree  or Northern Ojibwa, and Anihshininiimowin in the language itself, is spoken in northern Ontario and northern Manitoba.  Although there is a significant increment of vocabulary borrowed from several Cree dialects, Severn Ojibwe is a dialect of Ojibwe. Two minor sub-dialects have been identified: Big Trout Lake, and Deer Lake, with Big Trout Lake being further subdivided into a Severn subgroup and a Winisk River subgroup. Severn Ojibwe is primarily written by its speakers using the Cree syllabary.

Algonquin
Ethnologue entry and ISO 639-3 code: ALQ (Algonquin)

The Algonquin dialect of Ojibwe is spoken in communities in northwestern Quebec and eastern Ontario (to be distinguished from the name of the Algonquian language family). Algonquin is spoken along the Ottawa River valley east of the Quebec-Ontario border, centered around Lake Abitibi.  Recognized Algonquin communities include: Amos (Pikogan), Cadillac, Grand Lac Victoria, Hunter's Point, Kipawa (Eagle Village), Notre Dame du Nord (Timiskaming), Rapid Lake (Barriere Lake), Rapid Sept, Lac Simon, Québec, Winneway (Long Point). The communities of Grand Lac Victoria (Kitcisakik) on Grand Lac Victoria and Lac Rapide on Cabonga Reservoir are within La Vérendrye Wildlife Reserve, a provincial park in Québec.

Algonquin is sometimes referred to as 'Northern Algonquin' to distinguish it from the southern communities at Golden Lake, Ontario and Maniwaki, Québec which have traditionally been grouped with Algonquin, but are here classified as belonging to the Nipissing dialect.

Although speakers of Ojibwe in the community of Kitigan Zibi (also called River Desert and formerly called Maniwaki) at Maniwaki, Québec self-identify as Algonquin, the language spoken there is Nipissing; Maniwaki speakers were among those who migrated from Oka, Quebec. Similarly, the nineteenth-century missionary  ('Grammar of the Algonquin language') describes Nipissing speech.

Algonquin orthography is not standardized. Some older texts were written in a French-based orthography in which the acute accent is used to indicate vowel length and the use of several consonant symbols accords with their general French values. Modern Algonquin-language resources tend to use a more English-based system, in which long vowels are marked with a grave accent (or alternatively by doubling the vowel).

The Nipissing dialect term  'downriver people' refers to Algonquin speakers, with the term for the language being .

There is support for a Western Algonquin subdialect, extending "…inland from Lake Huron and east of Lake Superior…" toward the Ontario-Québec border. Representative communities from this area include Temagami, Ontario and Biscotasing, Ontario.

Southern dialects
The southern dialects are presented east to west.

Ottawa
Ethnologue entry and ISO 639-3 code: OTW (Ottawa)

The Ottawa dialect is spoken in southern Ontario and northern Michigan, with main communities on Manitoulin Island, Ontario; at Walpole Island, Ontario; as well as Saugeen and Cape Croker. Ottawa and the neighboring Eastern Ojibwe dialect are characterized by extensive vowel Syncope, which deletes metrically weak short vowels.

The term  '(speaking the) Ottawa language' is also used to refer specifically to Ottawa.

Ottawa is generally written with a version of the Double vowel writing system.

Eastern Ojibwe
Ethnologue entry and ISO 639-3 code: OJG (Eastern Ojibwe)

The Eastern Ojibwe dialect is spoken east of Georgian Bay, Ontario.  The main Eastern Ojibwe communities are Curve Lake, Ontario and Rama, Ontario. Eastern Ojibwe and the neighboring Ottawa dialect are characterized by extensive vowel Syncope, which deletes metrically weak short vowels.

Eastern Ojibwe is generally written with a version of the Double vowel writing system.

Southwestern Ojibwe
Ethnologue entry and ISO 639-3 code: CIW (Southwestern Ojibwe ("Chippewa"))

Southwestern Ojibwe is spoken in Minnesota and Wisconsin. This dialect is also referred in English as "Chippewa". The general Ojibwe term  is applied to this dialect. Southwestern Ojibwe is most generally written using the Double vowel writing system.

Border Lakes
There is no Ethnologue entry or ISO 639-3 code for this dialect of Ojibwe.

Border Lakes Ojibwe is spoken in the Lake of the Woods area of Ontario near the borders of Ontario, Minnesota, and Manitoba. Although communities within the Border Lakes area have been considered part of the Saulteaux dialect, current classification treats Border Lakes as a separate dialect in the Southern tier. Communities identified as Border Lakes include Lac La Croix, Emo (Rainy River First Nation), and Whitefish Bay, all in Ontario.

Saulteaux
Ethnologue entry and ISO 639-3 code: OJW (Plains Ojibwe/Saulteaux ("Western Ojibwe"))

Saulteaux Ojibwe (also Western Ojibwe or Plains Ojibwe) is spoken in the Canadian provinces of Manitoba, Saskatchewan, and Alberta, with an outlying group in British Columbia.

Transition dialects
The transition dialects are listed east to west.

Nipissing communities have sometimes been classified as Eastern Ojibwe, but other research notes that several features distinguish the dialect documented at Gitigan Zibi (Maniwaki) from Eastern Ojibwe material documented from the core Eastern Ojibwe communities of Curve Lake and Rama.

Nipissing
There is no EthnologueEthnologue entry or ISO 639-3 code for the Nipissing dialect of Ojibwe.

The Nipissing dialect of Ojibwe is spoken in the area of Lake Nipissing in Ontario. A representative community in the Nipissing dialect area is Golden Lake, although the language is moribund at that location. Although speakers of Ojibwe in the community of Kitigan Zibi (also called River Desert) at Maniwaki, Québec self-identify as Algonquin, the language spoken there is Nipissing. Maniwaki speakers were among those who migrated from Oka, Quebec. Similarly, the nineteenth-century missionary  ('Grammar of the Algonquin language') describes Nipissing speech.

The term  'those at the end of the lake' is attributed to Algonquin speakers as a term for Nipissing dialect speakers, with related  'Nipissing language'. It is also cited from Ojibwe dialects other than Nipissing or Algonquin with the meaning 'Algonquin Indian', for example from Southwestern Ojibwe; other sources ranging from the seventeenth to nineteenth centuries cite the same form from several different Ojibwe dialects, including Ottawa.

Speakers of this dialect generally use a French-based writing system.

North of Superior
 There is no EthnologueEthnologue entry or ISO 639-3 code for the North of Superior dialect of Ojibwe.

The North of Superior dialect is spoken on the north shore of Lake Superior in the area to the west and east of Lake Nipigon. Communities include (east to west) Pic Mobert, Pic Heron, Pays Plat, Long Lac, Aroland, Rocky Bay, and Lake Helen, all in Ontario.

Berens River Ojibwe
 There is no EthnologueEthnologue entry or ISO 639-3 code for the Berens River dialect of Ojibwe.

Berens River Ojibwe is spoken along the Berens River in northern Ontario. Reported communities include Pikangikum and Poplar Hill, both in Ontario.

Northwestern Ojibwe
Ethnologue entry and ISO 639-3 code: OJB (Northwestern Ojibwe)

The Northwestern dialect of Ojibwe is spoken approximately from northwest of Lake Nipigon, north of the Lake of the Woods area south of the Berens River to the Manitoba border. Communities identified as Northwestern include (east to west) Armstrong, Osnaburgh House, Cat Lake, Lac Seul, Grassy Narrows, and Red Lake.

Dialect not recognized in this analysis

Central Ojibwe
Ethnologue entry and ISO 639-3 code: OJC (Central Ojibwe)

The Central Ojibwe dialect (also known as Central Ojibwe, Ojibway) is recognized in some analyses as a dialect of Ojibwe spoken in Ontario from Lake Nipigon in the west to Lake Nipissing in the east. In the analysis accepted in this article Central Ojibwe is not recognized; it is divided into North of (Lake) Superior and Nipissing.

Language code correspondence table

In literature

In regionally specific dictionaries

See also
Ojibwe language
Ojibwe phonology
Ojibwe grammar
Ojibwe writing systems

Notes

References

Baraga, Frederic. 1878. A dictionary of the Otchipwe language, explained in English. A new edition, by a missionary of the Oblates. Part I, English-Otchipwe; Part II, Otchipwe-English. Montréal: Beauchemin & Valois. Reprint (in one volume), Minneapolis: Ross and Haines, 1966, 1973.
Bloomfield, Leonard. 1958. Eastern Ojibwa: Grammatical sketch, texts and word list. Ann Arbor: University of Michigan Press.
 Cappel, Constance.(editor), 2007. Odawa Language and Legends: Andrew J. Blackbird and Raymond Kiogima, Philadelephia, PA: Xlibris Corp.
 Cote, Margaret. 1984. Nahkawēwin: Saulteaux (Ojibway dialect of the Plains). Regina SK: Saskatchewan Indian Federated College.
 Cuoq, Jean André. 1886. Lexique de la langue algonquine. Montréal: J. Chapleau.
 Cuoq, Jean André. 1891. Grammaire de la langue algonquine. Société royale du Canada, Mémoires 9(1): 85-114; 10(1): 41-119.
 Day, Gordon. 1978. "Nipissing." Bruce Trigger, ed., Handbook of North American Indians, Volume 15, Northeast, pp. 786–791. Washington:  Smithsonian Institution. 
 Day, Gordon and Bruce Trigger. 1978. "Algonquin." Bruce Trigger, ed., Handbook of North American Indians, Volume 15, Northeast, pp. 792–797. Washington:  Smithsonian Institution. 
 Gilstrap, Roger. 1978. Algonquin dialect relationships in northwestern Quebec. National Museum of Man Mercury Series. Canadian Ethnology Service Paper No. 44. Ottawa: National Museums of Canada. 
 Goddard, Ives. 1978.  "Central Algonquian Languages." Bruce Trigger, ed., Handbook of North American Indians, Volume 15, Northeast, pp. 583–587. Washington:  Smithsonian Institution. 
 Goddard, Ives. 1979. “Comparative Algonquian.” Lyle Campbell and Marianne Mithun, eds, The languages of Native America, pp. 70–132. Austin: University of Texas Press. 
 Goddard, Ives. 1994. "The West-to-East Cline in Algonquian Dialectology." William Cowan, ed., Papers of the 25th Algonquian Conference, pp. 187–211. Ottawa: Carleton University. 
 Goddard, Ives. 1996. "Introduction." Ives Goddard, ed., The Handbook of North American Indians, Volume 17. Languages, pp. 1–16. Washington, D.C.: The Smithsonian Institution. 
Gordon, Raymond G. Jr. 2005. Ethnologue: Languages of the World, 15th edition. Ethnologue entry for Central Ojibwa. Retrieved May 31, 2009. Dallas: SIL International. 
McGregor, Ernest. 1987. Algonquin lexicon. Maniwaki, QC: River Desert Education Authority.
Moseley, Christopher. 2007. Encyclopedia of World's Endangered Languages. Agingdon, Oxon: Routledge. .
Nichols, John. 1980. Ojibwe morphology. PhD dissertation, Harvard University.
 Nichols, John. 1996. "The Cree syllabary." Peter Daniels and William Bright, eds. The world’s writing systems, 599-611. New York: Oxford University Press. 
Nichols, John and Earl Nyholm. 1995. A concise dictionary of Minnesota Ojibwe. St. Paul: University of Minnesota Press. 
Omàmawininì Anishinàbemowin. n.d. Algonquin. Retrieved June 1, 2016. Pikwàkanagàn: Omàmawininì Anishinàbemowin.
 O'Meara, John. 1993. Review of Ernest McGregor, 1987, 'Algonquin Lexicon.' International Journal of American Linguistics 59(1): 108-113.
Rhodes, Richard. 1976. "A preliminary report on the dialects of Eastern Ojibwa-Odawa." W. Cowan, ed., Papers of the seventh Algonquian conference, 129-156. Ottawa: Carleton University.
Rhodes, Richard A. 1985. Eastern Ojibwa–Chippewa–Ottawa Dictionary. Berlin: Mouton de Gruyter. 
Rhodes, Richard and Evelyn Todd. 1981. "Subarctic Algonquian languages." June Helm, ed., The Handbook of North American Indians, Volume 6. Subarctic, pp. 52–66. Washington, D.C.: The Smithsonian Institution. 
Snache, Irene. 2005. Rama First Nation Ojibwe language dictionary. Rama, ON: Mnjikaning Kendaaswin Publishers. 
Valentine, J. Randolph. 1994. Ojibwe dialect relationships. PhD dissertation, University of Texas, Austin.
Valentine, J. Randolph. 2001. Nishnaabemwin Reference Grammar. Toronto: University of Toronto Press.

External links
 Ojibwe Language Society
 Dr. J. Randolph Valentine's introduction to Ojibwe
 Ojibwe Dialect Relations : Lexical Maps by Dr. J. Randolph Valentine (1995) — a study in differences in vocabulary among different Anishinaabemowin-speaking communities, with accompanying dialectological maps.
 Freelang Ojibwe Dictionary – Freeware off-line dictionary, updated with additional entries every 6–10 weeks.
 Language Museum report for Ojibwe
 Aboriginal Languages of Canada – With data on speaker populations
 Language Geek Page on Ojibwe – Syllabary fonts and keyboard emulators are also available from this site.
 Our Languages: Nakawē (Saskatchewan Indian Cultural Centre)
 The Linguasphere Register. 1999 / 2000 edition. Algic sector.

 
Indigenous languages of the North American eastern woodlands
Indigenous languages of the North American Subarctic
First Nations languages in Canada
Indigenous languages of the United States
+